Solketal is a protected form of glycerol with an isopropylidene acetal group joining two neighboring hydroxyl groups. Solketal contains a chiral center on the center carbon of the glycerol backbone, and so can be purchased as either the racemate or as one of the two enantiomers. Solketal has been used extensively in the synthesis of mono-, di- and triglycerides by ester bond formation. The free hydroxyl groups of solketal can be esterified with a carboxylic acid to form the protected monoglyceride, where the isopropylene group can then be removed using an acid catalyst in aqueous or alcoholic medium. The unprotected diol can then be esterified further to form either the di- or triglyceride.

References

  
 
 
 

Ketals
Primary alcohols